Strictly Confidential is a six-part drama, written by Kay Mellor and originally shown on ITV from 16 November to 21 December 2006.

Plot
It stars Suranne Jones as Linda, a bisexual ex police officer turned sex therapist, who shares a practice in Leeds with her brother-in-law, played by Tristan Gemmill. Her life is complicated by the fact that her husband Richard, her business partner's brother, played by Cristian Solimeno, has low fertility and cannot give her the baby she wants. She is all for asking his brother (her business partner) to be a sperm donor, which does not sit well with his wife (Kate Isitt). Linda's husband (Richard) is also not keen on the idea at all but lets Linda go ahead and ask his brother who consents to be a sperm donor. Sexual tension becomes obvious between the pair, and they soon begin sleeping together, with disastrous consequences for all involved, especially Angie (Eva Pope), Linda's ex-lover who is still very much in love with Linda.

Further complications occur with Linda's involvement as a CID consultant in a bizarre spate of murders that centre on erotic asphyxiation and could be linked back to her practice. The murder enquiry is led by Linda's former lover, played by Eva Pope. However Linda is suspicious of the second 'murder' and of Angie, as it all seems a bit too convenient.

References

External links
 

2006 British television series debuts
2006 British television series endings
2000s British drama television series
2000s British television miniseries
ITV television dramas
ITV (TV network) original programming
2000s British LGBT-related drama television series